The Tri-State Admirals are an American professional basketball team based out of New York metropolitan area, and a member of The Basketball League (TBL).

History
The Rochester Razorsharks joined the North American Premier Basketball for the 2018 season and planned to play in The Basketball League in 2019 before the team decided to sit out the season. In February 2020, TBL announced the new Rochester Revolution as a 2020 expansion team, but that owner decided to move the team to New Jersey as the Tri-State Admirals. 

In 2021, league president, David Magley took over team operations and funded all costs. For the 2022 season, sports marketing consultant, and Columbia University professor Michael Dittleman became team general manager.

Current roster

References

Basketball teams established in 2019
Basketball teams in New Jersey
Jersey City, New Jersey
2019 establishments in New Jersey
The Basketball League teams